Ozanköy Spor Kulübü is a Turkish Cypriot sports club based in Ozanköy, Kyrenia.

Colors
The club colors are red and white.

Stadium
The club's home stadium is Ozanköy Stadı.

Notable players
 Guy Massamba N'Sakala

Football clubs in Northern Cyprus
Association football clubs established in 1956
1956 establishments in Cyprus